The Newcastle Chronicle and Hunter River District News (also published as the Newcastle Chronicle) was a weekly English language newspaper published in Newcastle, New South Wales.

History
The newspaper was first published in 1858. It was originally published weekly but was later published more frequently, moving to biweekly and then triweekly editions. From 1866 to 1876 it was published as the Newcastle Chronicle.

The paper ceased publication in 1876, with the commencement of The Newcastle Morning Herald and Miners Advocate. The Herald also replaced the Miners Advocate and Northumberland Recorder which had commenced publication in 1873.

In November 1875, William Aubrey Burnage became a partner in the business. In January of the following year Hugh M'Dicken sold his share in the partnership to Burnage, leaving Burnage as sole proprietor.

Archives
The newspaper is available on microfilm at the State Library of New South Wales. It has been digitised by the National Library of Australia under its Newspaper Digitisation Program.

See also 
 List of newspapers in Australia

References

External links 
 

Defunct newspapers published in New South Wales
Mass media in Newcastle, New South Wales